Elsk meg i morgen (English: "Love me tomorrow") is a 2005 Norwegian comedy film directed by Petter Næss, starring Per Christian Ellefsen and Sven Nordin. The film was based on a novel by Ingvar Ambjørnsen, and is a sequel to Elling. In this installment of the series, which takes place four years after the original, Elling is looking for love.

External links
 
 

2005 films
2005 comedy films
Films directed by Petter Næss
Norwegian comedy films
2000s Norwegian-language films